Antoniopolis was a town of ancient Paphlagonia, inhabited in Roman and Byzantine times. 

Its site is located near Çerkes, Asiatic Turkey.

References

Populated places in ancient Paphlagonia
Former populated places in Turkey
Roman towns and cities in Turkey
Populated places of the Byzantine Empire
History of Çankırı Province